The National High Court was a high court in Iceland established in 1800. The court was established due to dissatisfaction with the High Court which had been the high court of the country from 1563. In 1919, the Supreme Court of Iceland was established replacing the National High Court.

References

Courts in Iceland
1800 establishments in Europe
18th century in Iceland
1919 disestablishments in Iceland
Courts and tribunals established in 1800
Courts and tribunals disestablished in 1919